"Conga" is the first hit single released by the American band Miami Sound Machine, led by Gloria Estefan, on their second English-language album, Primitive Love. The song was written by the band's drummer and lead songwriter Enrique Garcia. The song first appeared on August 31, 1985, as part of the album. The single was released in Australia on September 9, 1985.

"Conga" became a worldwide success and is recognized as the Miami Sound Machine and Gloria Estefan's signature song. The single reached the top 10 in various countries, including the United States and the Netherlands.

Background
According to Gloria Estefan in an interview in the Netherlands television show RTL Late Night, Conga was written after the band had performed "Dr. Beat" in a club called Cartouche in Utrecht, the Netherlands.  "Conga" is written in the key of E minor.

"Conga" was re-recorded as a new remix in 2001, including samples of "Dr. Beat" and "Rhythm Is Gonna Get You" and was released on Estefan's fourth compilation album. This new song was released as a promo single in Spain and titled "Y-Tu-Conga." 

A version of "Conga" arranged with Brazilian rhythms and instrumentation and renamed "Samba" is included in Estefan's 2020 album Brazil305. A remix of "Conga" featuring Leslie Grace and Meek Mill was released in 2021 as a Bacardi sponsored and Boi-1da produced single.

Commercial performance
The single was released in 1985 and became a worldwide hit, reaching #10 on the U.S. Billboard Hot 100 and winning the Grand Prize at the 15th annual "Tokyo Music Festival" in Japan.  The single was certified Gold by the RIAA in the U.S. for shipments of 500,000 copies. However, it wasn't a hit in the United Kingdom, failing to chart on the top 75.

In Billboard magazine's year-end chart in 1986, "Conga" finished at number 40.

Music video
The video is set in the fictional Miami night club Copacabana, hosting a reception for an unspecified ambassador. After a boring piano recital, the Miami Sound Machine is announced as the next featured act (though Gloria insists the setting is not appropriate for the song). Despite the initial shock of his wife, the more upbeat song becomes a hit with the audience and ambassador. Clips of the original video feature in the video of Estefan's 2020 Brazilian themed version, "Samba".

Formats and track listings

Charts

Weekly charts

Year-end charts

Certifications

Release history

References

1985 singles
Miami Sound Machine songs
Gloria Estefan songs
Songs about dancing
Number-one singles in Spain
RPM Top Singles number-one singles
Songs written by Enrique Garcia (songwriter)
1985 songs
Epic Records singles